Cryptolechia semibrunnea is a moth in the family Depressariidae. It was described by Paul Dognin in 1905. It is found in Ecuador (Loja Province).

References

Moths described in 1905
Cryptolechia (moth)